Armstead T. Johnson High School is a historic high school complex for African-American students located near Montross, Westmoreland County, Virginia. The main building was built in 1937, and is a one-story, "U"-shaped Colonial Revival style brick building.  Contributing structures on the property include the one-story, frame Industrial Arts Building and the one-story, frame Home Economics Cottage. At a time when the state had a policy of legal racial segregation in public schools, this was among the first purpose-built high schools for African Americans on the Northern Neck of Virginia.

The building, listed on the National Register of Historic Places in 1998, is now operated as a museum to preserve the history and legacy of education for African-American students in the Northern Neck, especially in Westmoreland County. It has collections, artifacts, memorabilia, and other materials related to this period.

References

External links
 Museum information - Westmoreland County History in the 21st Century

African-American history of Virginia
School buildings on the National Register of Historic Places in Virginia
Colonial Revival architecture in Virginia
School buildings completed in 1937
Schools in Westmoreland County, Virginia
National Register of Historic Places in Westmoreland County, Virginia
Museums in Westmoreland County, Virginia
African-American museums in Virginia